Preethigagi is a 2007 Indian Kannada-language romance film directed by S. Mahendar and starring Murali and Sridevi Vijayakumar. It is a remake of the 1997 Malayalam film Aniyathipraavu. The plot is of a love story between a boy and a girl, whose relationship is not approved by their families, who eventually elope.

Cast

 Murali as Sanju 
 Sridevi Vijaykumar as Mili 
 Ramakrishna as Sanju's father
 Bhavya as Sanju's mother
 Jayanthi as Mili's mother
 Avinash as Rajeev
 Chithra Shenoy
 Doddanna
 Mukhyamantri Chandru
 Shobaraj as Venkat
 Srujan Lokesh as Mili's brother
 Preethi
 Amrutha
 Master Anand as Sanju's friend
 Nagashekar
 Bank Janardhan
 Honnavalli Krishna
 Karthik Sharma

Production 
Ramu agreed to produce the film although he usually does not not produce any remake films. In order to get tax exemption, the film was released ten years after the original film.

Soundtrack

S. A. Rajkumar composed the film's background score and music for its soundtrack. The track "Ennai Thalatta" from the Tamil version was reused as "Kanninalli". The track "Ee Preethi" was reused from composer's own Tamil track "Pirivondrai" from Piriyadha Varam Vendum (2001) while "Ananda" was reused from composer's another own Tamil track "Rosapoo" from Surya Vamsam. The album consists of eight tracks.

Reception 
A critic from Sify wrote that "Director S.Mahender has nothing new to offer story wise and could have stuck to village based films that he is famous for". A critic from Rediff.com wrote that "Preethigaagi is enjoyable for those who haven't seen the original".

References

External links
 

Kannada remakes of Malayalam films
2007 films
2000s Kannada-language films
Indian interfaith romance films
Films directed by S. Mahendar
2000s romance films